Holte station is the railway station in Holte near Copenhagen, Denmark. It is served by S-trains on the Hillerød radial. The station is also served by nine bus routes, providing connections to all nearby towns and villages.

History
The location was chosen as a railway stopping place, which was used as a location for drawing water into the steam trains.

See also
 List of railway stations in Denmark

References

 Holte (DSB information)

External links

S-train (Copenhagen) stations
Railway stations opened in 1864
Railway stations in Denmark opened in the 19th century